Grand China Air Co., Ltd. (GCA) is a Chinese airline based at Haikou Meilan International Airport.

History
Grand China Air was formed on 29 November 2007 under the initiative of the HNA group's largest operational entity, Hainan Airlines, to merge its operations with HNA Group's subsidiaries Shanxi Airlines, Chang An Airlines, and China Xinhua Airlines. The airline is headquartered in Beijing and registered in Hainan Province. As of 14 April 2012 only one of its 737-800s have been fitted with winglets.

Grand China Air was owned by 23 shareholders. The top 5 shareholders were Hainan Development Holdings (24.97%), HNA Group (23.11%), Starstep (9.57%), Haikou Meilan International Airport (8.30%) and Shenhua Group (5.56%). It was reported that George Soros was a minority shareholder It was reported that Starstep was still owned by Soros. Former associate of Soros, Bharat Bhisé, via Pan-American Aviation Holdings, owned 4.00% stake of Grand China Air as the 8th largest shareholder (in 2015 Pan-American was acquired by Jun Guan); Pan-American Aviation Holdings was a minority shareholder of HNA Group indirectly.

U.S. sanctions 
In January 2021, the United States government named Grand China Air as a company "owned or controlled" by the People's Liberation Army and thereby prohibited any American company or individual from investing in it.

Destinations
Grand China Air will serve the same destinations as Hainan Airlines.

Fleet

Current fleet
, Grand China Air operates an all-Boeing fleet consisting of the following aircraft:

Former fleet
The airline previously operated the following aircraft (as of August 2018):
 1 further Boeing 737-800

References

External links 

Official website

Airlines of China
Airlines established in 2007
Companies based in Hainan
HNA Group
Chinese companies established in 2007
Chinese brands